Parnell Hall may refer to:

Parnell Hall (Little Rock, Arkansas), listed on the National Register of Historic Places in Arkansas
Parnell Hall (writer), a writer